In mathematics, the reciprocal gamma function is the function

where  denotes the gamma function. Since the gamma function is meromorphic and nonzero everywhere in the complex plane, its reciprocal is an entire function.

The reciprocal is sometimes used as a starting point for numerical computation of the gamma function, and a few software libraries provide it separately from the regular gamma function.

Karl Weierstrass called the reciprocal gamma function the "factorielle" and used it in his development of the Weierstrass factorization theorem.

Infinite product expansion
Following from the infinite product definitions for the gamma function, due to Euler and Weierstrass respectively, we get the following infinite product expansion for the reciprocal gamma function:

where  is the Euler–Mascheroni constant.  These expansions are valid for all complex numbers .

Taylor series
Taylor series expansion around 0 gives:

where  is the Euler–Mascheroni constant. For , the coefficient  for the  term can be computed recursively as

where  is the Riemann zeta function. An integral representation for these coefficients was recently found by Fekih-Ahmed (2014):

For small values, these give the following values:

Fekih-Ahmed (2014) also gives an approximation for :

 

The Taylor expansion around  has the same (but shifted) coefficients, i.e.:

(the reciprocal of Gauss' pi-function).

Asymptotic expansion
As  goes to infinity at a constant  we have:

Contour integral representation
An integral representation due to Hermann Hankel is

where  is the Hankel contour, that is, the path encircling 0 in the positive direction, beginning at and returning to positive infinity with respect for the branch cut along the positive real axis. According to Schmelzer & Trefethen, numerical evaluation of Hankel's integral is the basis of some of the best methods for computing the gamma function.

Integral representations at the positive integers

For positive integers , there is an integral for the reciprocal factorial function given by 

Similarly, for any real  and  we have the next integral for the reciprocal gamma function along the real axis in the form of : 

 

where the particular case when  provides a corresponding relation for the reciprocal double factorial function,

Integral along the real axis

Integration of the reciprocal gamma function along the positive real axis gives the value

which is known as the Fransén–Robinson constant.

See also
 Bessel–Clifford function
 Inverse-gamma distribution

References

 Mette Lund, An integral for the reciprocal Gamma function
 Milton Abramowitz & Irene A. Stegun, Handbook of Mathematical Functions with Formulas, Graphs, and Mathematical Tables
 Eric W. Weisstein, Gamma Function, MathWorld

Gamma and related functions
Analytic functions